Siderolamprus bivittatus, the two-banded galliwasp, is a species of lizard of the Diploglossidae family. It is found in Guatemala, Honduras, El Salvador, and Nicaragua.

It was formerly classified in the genus Diploglossus, but was moved to Siderolamprus in 2021.

References

Siderolamprus
Reptiles described in 1895
Reptiles of Guatemala
Reptiles of Honduras
Reptiles of El Salvador
Reptiles of Nicaragua
Taxa named by George Albert Boulenger